Sunrise Mill is a historic grist mill complex located near Schwenksville, at Upper Frederick Township, Montgomery County, Pennsylvania in the United States. The complex includes a circa 1767 grist mill (enlarged in 1819) with an attached saw mill, circa 1828 farmhouse, and Swiss bank barn (1795). The grist mill originally operated using an internal waterwheel system that ran off the adjacent Swamp Creek, before converting to turbine power after 1870. The property also includes a mill dam (reconstructed in 1891), mill race, and stone arch bridge that was built around 1845.  

The property was later owned by Dr. Chevalier Jackson (1865-1958), an internationally known physician and specialist laryngology, who lived at Sunrise from 1919 until his death in 1958. Dr. Jackson established a workspace inside the grist mill where, using power generated by the mill to run a lathe, he invented, over 200 different medical instruments used for laryngeal surgery. Dr. Jackson also kept an art studio in the grist mill where he painted nature scenes of the surrounding area. 

In 1977, the Sunrise Mill complex was added to the National Register of Historic Places.

The site is now owned and operated by the Montgomery County Division of Parks, Trails, and Historic Sites. It is currently undergoing a restoration project to be opened to the public as a history site.

References

External links

 Montgomery County Department of Parks and Heritage Services: Sunrise Mill

Grinding mills on the National Register of Historic Places in Pennsylvania
Industrial buildings completed in 1819
Grinding mills in Montgomery County, Pennsylvania
National Register of Historic Places in Montgomery County, Pennsylvania
Upper Frederick Township, Montgomery County, Pennsylvania